Lynn Shores (1893–1949) was an American film director.  Shores was born on September 22, 1893, in Binghamton, New York, and is best known for directing Sally's Shoulders (1928), A Million to One (1936) and Here's Flash Casey (1938). Lynn died on December 28, 1949, in Los Angeles, California.

Selected filmography
 Sally's Shoulders (1928)
 Stolen Love (1928)
 Skinner's Big Idea (1928)
 Sally of the Scandals (1928)
 The Jazz Age (1929)
 The Voice of the Storm (1929)
 The Delightful Rogue (1929)
 The Glory Trail (1936)
 Rebellion (1936)
 Here's Flash Casey (1937)
 The Shadow Strikes (1937)
 Woman in Distress (1937)
 Charlie Chan at the Wax Museum (1940)
 Golden Hoofs (1941)

References

Bibliography

External links

1893 births
1949 deaths
Film directors from New York (state)
People from Binghamton, New York